John Christian Luning (1863 – 1928) was a mayor of the town of Leesburg, Florida, during the 1890s and Lake County Commissioner. He would go on to serve the shortest term as Florida's Commissioner of Agriculture for 14 days before going on to serve as State Treasurer of Florida. He was part of a group of Florida leaders known as the "Three Musketeers" – along with James B. Whitfield (a state treasurer and state attorney general before serving nearly 40 years on the Florida Supreme Court) and William V. Knott (who held various cabinet positions for nearly 40 continuous years before becoming a political appointee) – and had a bright political future before his sudden death in September 1928.

Getting to the state treasurer's office
In an odd occurrence of events in early 1912, both Florida Commissioner of Agriculture Benjamin E. McLin and Florida Comptroller A.C. Croom died within a week or two of each other while separately campaigning in South Florida in February. Following the death of McLin, Governor Albert W. Gilchrist appointed Luning the Commissioner of Agriculture. When Croom died, Whitfield, Knott, and Luning went to see the Governor. It is reported that Luning intended to apply to be State Comptroller but Gilchrist wanted someone experienced in the position.  Knott (who was serving as Treasurer at the time) ended up being appointed to the State Comptroller position. Luning was appointed to fill the state treasurer position Knott vacated on February 19, a mere 14 days after having been appointed as agriculture commissioner. Luning had to immediately gear up to defend his position in the 1912 election. Robert Andrew Gray – who would later serve 31 years as Florida Secretary of State and 31 years as on the Florida Board of Education – worked on Luning's campaign and recalled that Luning won a three-way primary by only 150 votes before going on to win the general election. He would continue to serve as state treasurer until his death in September 1928.

Death
In his capacity as the ex officio Insurance Commissioner of Florida, Luning went to South Dakota in September 1928 to attend a conference of the National Association of Insurance Commissioners (NAIC). Luning's trip resulted in his death on September 26 while he was riding through the mountains with friends. Luning was a past president of NAIC and was well respected by the organization's members; as a result a delegation of its members escorted his body back to Leesburg. His escort included A. W. Briscoe, a former Alabama Commissioner of Insurance, and Joe F. Little, president of Citizens Life Insurance Company of Alabama.

References

1863 births
1928 deaths
County commissioners in Florida
Florida Commissioners of Agriculture
State Treasurers of Florida
Florida Democrats
State cabinet secretaries of Florida
Mayors of places in Florida